Abhishek is a  Hindu given name that has its roots in the Sanskrit word . It denotes a method of worship in  Hinduism and Buddhism. The conceptual meaning is related to purification or cleansing, symbolized by the actual puja ritual.

Notable people 

 Abhishek (field hockey) (born 1999), Indian field hockey player
 Abhishek Ambekar (born 1991), Indian footballer
 Abhishek Avasthi (born 1982), Indian actor, choreographer, dancer and model
 Abhishek Bachchan (born 1976), Indian actor, entrepreneur, presenter, producer and singer
 Abhisek Banerjee (born 1984), Indian cricketer
 Abhishek Banerjee (born 1987), Indian politician and member of parliament
 Abhishek Bhat (born 1989), Indian cricketer
 Abhishek Chatterjee (born 1964), Indian actor
 Abhishek Chaubey (born 1977),  Indian director and screenwriter
 Abhishek Das (born 1993), Indian footballer
 Abhishek Dhar (born 1970), Indian physicist
 Abhishek Hegde (born 1987), Indian cricketer
 Abhishek Jain (born 1986), Indian director and producer
 Abhishek Jhunjhunwala (born 1982), Indian cricketer
 Abhishek Kapoor (born 1971), Indian actor, director and writer
 Abhisek Lahiri (born 1983), Indian classical sarod player
 Abhishek Malik (born 1990), Indian actor and model
 Abhishek Matoria, Indian politician
 Abhishek Mishra (born 1977), Indian politician
 Abhishek Nayar (born 1983), Indian cricketer
 Abhishek Poddar (born 1968), Indian businessman
 Abhishek Raghuram (born 1985), Indian singer and vocalist
 Abhishek Raut (born 1987), Indian cricketer
 Abhishek Rawat (born 1980), Indian actor
 Abhishek Ray, Indian composer and singer
 Abhishek Pratap Shah (born 1982), Nepalese politician
 Abhishek Reddy (born 14 September 1994), Indian cricketer
 Abhishek Shankar , Indian actor and director of Tamil films
 Abhishek Sharma (disambiguation)
 Abhishek Singh (disambiguation)
 Abhishek Singhvi (born 1959), Indian politician
 Abhishek Varman, Indian film director
 Abhishek Verma (born 1989), Indian archer
 Abhishek Verma (born 1968), Indian arms dealer
 Abhishek Yadav (born 1980), Indian footballer
 Krishna Abhishek (born 1981), Indian actor and comedian

References 

Hindu given names
Indian masculine given names
Nepalese given names